Semaphorin-3B is a protein that in humans is encoded by the SEMA3B gene.

Function 

The semaphorin/collapsin family of molecules plays a critical role in the guidance of growth cones during neuronal development. The secreted protein encoded by this gene family member is important in axonal guidance and has been shown to act as a tumor suppressor by inducing apoptosis.

References

Further reading